Rafael Rodríguez Mohedano (1725–1787) was a Spanish Franciscan, historian and writer.

Spanish male writers
Spanish literary critics
Spanish Franciscans
1725 births
1787 deaths